Nesso is a comune (municipality) in the Province of Como in the Italian region Lombardy, located about  north of Milan and about  northeast of Como. As of 31 December 2004, it had a population of 1,294 and an area of 15.0 km².

Its toponym is Celtic and means "mooring".

Nesso borders the following municipalities: Argegno, Brienno, Caglio, Faggeto Lario, Laglio, Lezzeno, Pognana Lario, Sormano, Veleso, Zelbio.

Geography 
The territory of Nesso extends on the western coast of the Triangolo Lariano, the territory found between the two branches of Lake Como. The village extends from the lake shore, then climbs on the mountain in the direction of Piano del Tivano. The altimetric extension goes from 199 m above sea level of the shore of the lake up to 1,417 m above sea level.

The territory is rich in watercourses. The two most important creeks are the Nosée and Tuf, which flow together to form a spectacular waterfall inside the Nesso gorge.

Demographic evolution

References

External links
 www.comune.nesso.co.it

Cities and towns in Lombardy